Jack Sock was the defending champion, but participated in the men's main draw, as he was ineligible to defend his title.

Oliver Golding claimed the title by defeating Jiří Veselý 5–7, 6–3, 6–4 in the final.

Seeds

Main draw

Finals

Top half

Section 1

Section 2

Bottom half

Section 3

Section 4

References

External links
 Main Draw

2011 US Open (tennis)
US Open, 2011 Boys' Singles